Jean Claudio (28 March 1927 – 11 January 1992) was a French actor.

Biography 
He began his acting career in the cinema at the age of ten, playing the role of the Tsarevich, son of Tsar Nicolas II in The Imperial Tragedy.

In 1938, at the age of eleven, he played Mathieu Sorgue in Les Disparus de Saint-Agil by Christian-Jaque. He entered the Paris Conservatory, where, at fourteen, he was given the role of Chérubin in Le Mariage de Figaro. He has since had an international career, particularly in the United States.

He wrote a collection of poems, Les faux joies (published in 1950), as well as several novels: The Hot Season, Les Torts Reciprocals, Monsieur Damoclès and L'inconnu de Genève

Selected filmography

 Rasputin (1938) - Le tsarevitch
  (1938) - Boy
 Boys' School (1938) - Mathieu Sorgue
 Crossroads (1938) - Paul de Vétheuil
 The Phantom Carriage (1939) - Un enfant
 L'Enfer des anges (1941) - Le jeune Lucien
 Andorra ou les Hommes d'airain (1942) - Angelo
 The Heart of a Nation (1943) - Félix enfant
 Les Cadets de l'océan (1945) - Michel
 Moulin Rouge (1952) - Drunken Reveller (uncredited)
 Marie Antoinette Queen of France (1956) - Fouquier-Tinville
 Elena and Her Men (1956) - Lionel Villaret
 Sylviane de mes nuits (1957) - Jean
 Dangerous Exile (1957) - DeCastres, Philippe's Comrade in Paris
 Pourquoi viens-tu si tard? (1959) - Le grand-duc russe
 Nathalie, agent secret (1959)
 Picnic on the Grass (1959) - Rousseau
 Charge of the Black Lancers (1962) - Sergio Di Tula
 Messalina vs. the Son of Hercules (1964) - Gaio Silio
 The Beauty Jungle (1964) - Armand
 Crimine a due (1964) - Davide Lugani
 The Magnificent Cuckold (1964) - The Man at the Swimming Pool (uncredited)
 Gentlemen of the Night (1964)
 Darling (1965) - Raoul Maxim
 Zeugin aus der Hölle (1966) - Charlos Bianchi
 Espions à l'affût (1966) - Max Savelan
 Triple Cross (1966) - Sergeant Thomas
 Moto Shel Yehudi (1969) - Kassik
 Una storia d'amore (1970) - Marco
 The Mushroom (1970) - L'inspecteur Kogan
 Children of Mata Hari (1970) - Fédor 'La Filature'
 Le fou (1970) - L'agent d'affaires
 Sentivano uno strano, eccitante, pericoloso puzzo di dollari (1973)
 A Thousand Billion Dollars (1982) - Vittorio Orta

References

External links
 

1927 births
1992 deaths
French male child actors
French male film actors
People from Neuilly-sur-Seine
French male television actors
20th-century French male actors